Oleg Emirov (8 September 1970 – 5 December 2021) was a Russian composer, arranger, and keyboardist.

References

External links 
 

1970 births
2021 deaths
Russian composers
Russian film score composers
Russian producers
Russian keyboardists
Music arrangers
Musicians from Saint Petersburg